John Edward Davison (2 September 1887 – 1 February 1971) was an English footballer and manager who had a long and successful association with the football clubs of Sheffield, playing for Sheffield Wednesday for 18 years and later managing Sheffield United for 20 years. His fairness and diplomacy earned him the nicknames of "The George Washington of Sheffield football" and "Honest Ted". Davison played as a goalkeeper in a career, which lasted between 1908 and 1926, he made 424 appearances in all competitions for Sheffield Wednesday (his only league club). Davison was only 5 ft 7 in (1.70 m) tall, very small for a goalkeeper, but he made up for this with lightning reflexes and top class anticipation. He has gone down in football records as the smallest goalkeeper ever to play for England, making just one appearance for the national team in March 1922.

Playing career
Davison was born in Gateshead, County Durham, the seventh of nine children. On leaving school he worked as a typesetter for a Newcastle newspaper and played football for Gateshead Town where he was spotted by Sheffield Wednesday's assistant manager Robert Brown who invited him to Hillsborough for a trial. Davison impressed in the trial, saving a penalty in a practice match and was signed in April 1908 as understudy to long standing Wednesday keeper Jack Lyall for a fee of £300.

Sheffield Wednesday
The 21-year-old Davison made his Wednesday debut on 10 October 1908, however he only made eight appearances in that first season, being unable to dislodge Lyall. The summer of 1909 saw Lyall leave for Manchester City and Davison became first choice keeper for the 1909–10 season. Davison was to remain first choice for the next 12 seasons, a remarkable achievement bearing in mind that he lost four years of his career to World War I when official football was suspended. Throughout his career Davison kept a record of every match he played in, this showed he played in 618 games, conceding 810 goals, it also revealed he was a specialist at keeping out penalties, saving 24 out of 77 faced.

Davison volunteered for the army during World War I and was sent to France in July 1916, serving with the Royal Field Artillery for the rest of the war. He did make two wartime appearances for Wednesday when he was home on leave. He returned safely from the war to make 20 appearances in the 1919–20 season as Wednesday were relegated from Division One, sharing goalkeeping duties with Arnold Birch. Davison became first choice keeper again the following season.

He was called up to the England team to face Wales on 13 March 1922 in the British Home Championship at Anfield and kept a clean sheet in a 1–0 win. He was also picked eight times for Sheffield's representative side and toured Australia with the FA in 1925. Davison remained first choice keeper until the 1924–25 season when Jack Brown threatened and eventually took over his place in the team. The 38-year-old Davison failed to make an appearance in Wednesday's Division Two championship winning side in 1925–26 and his days at Hillsborough were coming to an end.

Management

Mansfield Town
In June 1926 he accepted the offer to become player/manager/secretary of Mansfield Town who at that time were a non-league side playing in the Midland League. In his first season in charge Mansfield had a good season winning the Notts Senior Cup, he impressed as a manager with the way he went about his business and getting the team to play attacking football. He continued playing until January 1927 when a broken rib in a game against Newark Town forced him to end his playing career. Davidson's management style had impressed near neighbours Chesterfield and when they were looking for a replacement for Alec Campbell they did not bother to advertise but went straight for Davison.

Chesterfield
Davison was appointed Chesterfield manager on 2 January 1928 at a wage of £6 a week. He immediately reorganised the club making clear divisions between the administrative and playing sides and bringing in experienced players such as Sid Binks. An improvement in results followed culminating in winning the Third Division North championship in 1930–31 with the team securing the championship on the last day of the season, scoring eight goals against Gateshead, Davison's home town club. Davison consolidated Chesterfield's position in Division Two the following season continuing to bring in experienced players such as ex England international George Ashmore, he also established a scouting network in his native north east to bring in young players. Davison had become one of the most talented and well organised managers around and it was no surprise when he was offered the newly created position of secretary/manager at Sheffield United in June 1932 as a replacement for the legendary John Nicholson who had been killed in a traffic accident earlier in the year after being Blades secretary for 33 years.

Sheffield United
Davison's first season at United saw them finish a respectable 10th in Division One, but the next season (1933–34) was a disaster as United were relegated for the first time in their history. The following season had The Blades in a mid table finishing position in Division Two although Davison had made the excellent signing of Jock Dodds on a free transfer from Lincoln City. United reached the 1936 FA Cup Final losing to Arsenal 1–0, the cup run probably cost the team promotion as they finished three points behind runners up Charlton Athletic. United eventually returned to Division One in the last full season before World War II finishing runners up and denying rivals Wednesday by one point. That 1938–39 season is notable for Davison as he made the purchase of Jimmy Hagan for £2,500 in November 1938, probably his best ever signing.

Davison remained in charge at Bramall Lane throughout the war years, with the team winning the Football League North in 1945–46. The return to peace time football saw United relegated from Division One in 1948–49 and then denied an immediate return the following season by city rivals Wednesday on goal average. Two mid table finishes and a failure to get a quick return to Division One saw Davison resign as United manager in August 1952.

Return to Chesterfield
Davison was not out of a job for long as he was immediately offered his old job as manager of Chesterfield who had just parted company with Bobby Marshall. Davison once again tried his formula of signing experienced players, with Dennis Westcott and Cyril Hatton arriving at Saltergate amongst others. He had to endure severe financial constraints with the club only being able to afford 14 full-time professionals. Despite this the team challenged for promotion, finishing sixth in Division Three North four seasons in succession. Davison's youth policy also saw fruition when the youth team reached the final of the FA Youth Cup in 1956 with future World Cup winner Gordon Banks one of the stars. He was asked to manage the Third Division North side against the South in April 1957. Davison stepped down as Chesterfield manager in May 1958, at the age of 70, however he did continue to do some scouting for the club.

After finally retiring, Teddy spent his latter years in Sheffield, passing away in February 1971 at the age of 83. His legacy is that he probably made the biggest individual impact on Sheffield football of any person in history.

References

External links
Profile at www.englandstats.com
Profile at www.englandfc.com

1887 births
Footballers from Gateshead
1971 deaths
English footballers
Association football goalkeepers
England international footballers
Sheffield Wednesday F.C. players
Mansfield Town F.C. players
Military personnel from County Durham
Gateshead F.C. players
English Football League players
English football managers
Mansfield Town F.C. managers
Chesterfield F.C. managers
Sheffield United F.C. managers
English Football League managers
Newcastle United F.C. wartime guest players
British Army personnel of World War I
Royal Field Artillery soldiers